Victor Miller may refer to:
 Victor A. Miller (1916–1984), Attorney General of Wisconsin
 Victor J. Miller (1888–1955), mayor of Saint Louis
 Victor S. Miller (born 1947), independent co-creator of elliptic curve cryptography
 Victor Miller (writer) (born 1940), television and film writer
 Victor Miller (Jericho), character from the television series Jericho
 Avigdor Miller (1908–2001), American Haredi rabbi whose English name was Victor
 Victor Miller, pilot, aircraft collector and founder of AeroGroup